KS&R is a nationally recognized strategic consultancy and marketing research firm that provides clients with timely, fact-based insights and actionable solutions through industry-centered expertise. Specializing in Business Services, Entercom & Recreation, Healthcare, Retail & E-Commerce, Technology, and Transportation & Logistics, KS&R empowers companies globally to make smarter business decisions.

The Firm is privately held and headquartered in Syracuse, New York. KS&R serves clients globally in more than 100 countries and in over 50 languages.

History 
KS&R was founded in 1983  as a spin-off of the Syracuse Research Corporation (SRC), a not-for-profit corporation. In 1985, KS&R began operating INSITE, an in-house contact center for survey research with 110 desks.

According to Marketing News magazine, since 2007 KS&R has been among the 50 largest market research firms, listed by revenue generated in the U.S. In 2012 the company was named the number one market research firm in the country for customer satisfaction by the Survey of Market Research Supplier Quality and Value by Prevision Corporation and Inside Research.

Along with industry-centered expertise, KS&R offers a wide variety of solutions including strategic consulting, brand building, and market sensing. Recently, KS&R has expanded its knowledge base with its new Experience Lab known as Tumble and Buyer Persona Institute (BPI), a division of KS&R that was founded in 2010 to give B2B companies insight into what their prospective customers need to know and experience before they will buy.

References 

Companies based in Syracuse, New York
Market research companies of the United States
1983 establishments in New York (state)
Consulting firms established in 1983